Encyclia ambigua is a species of orchid.

References

ambigua
ambigua
Orchids of Central America
Orchids of Belize